Beilschmiedia zeylanica is a species of plant in the family Lauraceae. It is endemic to Sri Lanka.

References

Flora of Sri Lanka
zeylanica
Endangered plants
Taxonomy articles created by Polbot